Antonio Alkana (born 12 April 1990) is a South African hurdler. He competed in the 110 metres hurdles event at the 2015 World Championships in Beijing narrowly missing the semifinals. In addition, he won the gold at the 2015 African Games. He also competed in the men's 110 metres hurdles at the 2020 Summer Olympics.

His personal bests are 13.11 seconds in the 110 metres hurdles (+1.8 m/s, Prague 2017) which is the African record and 7.76 seconds in the 60 metres hurdles (Portland 2016).

Competition record

References

External links
 

1990 births
Living people
South African male hurdlers
World Athletics Championships athletes for South Africa
Sportspeople from Cape Town
Athletes (track and field) at the 2015 African Games
Athletes (track and field) at the 2016 Summer Olympics
Olympic athletes of South Africa
Athletes (track and field) at the 2018 Commonwealth Games
African Games gold medalists for South Africa
African Games medalists in athletics (track and field)
Athletes (track and field) at the 2019 African Games
African Championships in Athletics winners
South African Athletics Championships winners
Commonwealth Games competitors for South Africa
Athletes (track and field) at the 2020 Summer Olympics